Anton Sabel (15 October 1902 – 5 January 1983) was a German politician of the Christian Democratic Union (CDU) and former member of the German Bundestag.

Life 
Sabel was a directly elected member of the German Bundestag in the Fulda constituency from its first election in 1949 until 16 September 1957.

Literature

References

1902 births
1983 deaths
Members of the Bundestag for Hesse
Members of the Bundestag 1953–1957
Members of the Bundestag 1949–1953
Members of the Bundestag for the Christian Democratic Union of Germany